Clayton Tune (born March 23, 1999) is an American college football quarterback for the Houston Cougars.

High school career
Tune attended Hebron High School in Carrollton, Texas. During his career he had 6,686 passing yards with 66 passing touchdowns and 1,074 rushing yards and 20 rushing touchdowns. He originally committed to the University of Kansas to play college football but later changed his commitment to the University of Houston.

College career
In his first year at Houston in 2018, Tune appeared in five games and made two starts as a backup to D'Eriq King. He started the final two games of the year in place of an injured King. For the season, he completed 59 of 117 passes for 795 yards with eight touchdowns and two interceptions. Tune entered 2019 again as the backup to King but took over as the starter after King decided to sit out the rest of the season. He completed 106 of 179 passes for 1,533 yards, 11 touchdowns and nine interceptions. Tune started all eight games in 2020, completing 170 of 285 passes for 2,048 yards, 15 touchdowns and 10 interceptions. In 2021, he started all 14 games and completed 287 of 421 passes for 3,546 yards with 30 touchdowns and 10 interceptions.

College statistics

References

External links
Houston Cougars bio

Living people
Players of American football from Texas
American football quarterbacks
Houston Cougars football players
1999 births